This is a list of current heads of state and heads of government. In some cases, mainly in presidential systems, there is only one leader being both head of state and head of government. In other cases, mainly in semi-presidential and parliamentary systems, the head of state and the head of government are different people. In semi-presidential and parliamentary systems, the head of government role (i.e. executive branch) is fulfilled by both the listed head of government and the head of state. In single-party systems, ruling party's leader (i.e. General Secretary) is usually the de facto top leader of the state, though sometimes this leader also holds the presidency or premiership.

The list includes the names of recently elected or appointed heads of state and government who will take office on an appointed date, as presidents-elect and prime ministers-designate, and those leading a government in exile if internationally recognised.

Member and observer states of the United Nations

Other states
The following states are in free association with another UN member state.

The following states control at least part of their territory and are recognised by at least one UN member state.

The following states control their territory, but are not recognised by any UN member states.

Other governments
These alternative governments control part of their territory and are recognised as legitimate by at least one UN member state.

These alternative governments control part of their territory, but are not recognized as legitimate by any UN member states.

These alternative governments do not control their territory but are recognized as legitimate by at least one UN member state.

Sui generis entities

See also

President of the Republic
List of countries by system of government
List of current state leaders by date of assumption of office
List of current monarchs of sovereign states
List of current vice presidents and designated acting presidents
List of current interior ministers
List of current foreign ministers
List of current finance ministers
List of current defence ministers
List of current presidents of legislatures
List of elected and appointed female heads of state and government
List of leaders of dependent territories
List of oldest living state leaders
List of national governments
Lists of state leaders
Lists of state leaders by century
List of state leaders in the 21st century
List of state leaders in

Notes

References

External links
CIDOB Foundation contextualised biographies of world political leaders
EmilePhaneufan archived, partial list of official websites for heads of state
Portale Storia a list of current rulers by country
Rulersa list of rulers throughout time and places
United Nationsa list of heads of state, heads of government, and foreign ministers

 
 
 
2020s in politics
Contemporary history